Michael Lee Barnett (born February 1, 1959 in Columbus, Ohio) is a former Major League Baseball hitting coach, most recently for the Houston Astros, and current replay coordinator for the Cleveland Guardians.

Playing career
Barnett played catcher at Ohio University, but had his baseball career end following a shoulder injury.

Coaching career
Barnett had a six-year stint as an assistant administrator of baseball operations for the New York Yankees from 1982 to 1987.

After leaving the Yankees, he spent two seasons on the coaching staff at the University of Tennessee from 1988 to 1989.

Following that, Barnett served as hitting coach at all levels of the Chicago White Sox organization from 1990 to 1997.

Barnett spent four seasons from 1998 to 2001 as hitting coach for Tucson (AAA) in the Arizona Diamondbacks organization.

Barnett served as hitting coach of the Toronto Blue Jays from 2002 to 2005, where he played a key role in the development of such hitters as Vernon Wells and Orlando Hudson. He helped lead the 2003 Blue Jays to an 86-76 record as the team ranked in the top 5 in the American League in numerous offensive categories including batting average (2nd), runs (2nd), hits (2nd) and home runs (5th).

After taking over as Royals hitting coach May 1, 2006, Barnett led the Royals to a .275 (1,339-4,867) average the remainder of the season. The Royals hit a franchise-record 335 doubles in 2006, the 4th-highest total in the Majors.

On August 19, 2012, Barnett was released from the Houston Astros, along with manager Brad Mills and first base coach Bobby Meacham. The Astros 39-82 record was the worst in the Major Leagues at the time.

Barnett was hired by the Cleveland Indians to serve as replay coordinator on January 14, 2016.

Personal
Barnett resides in Knoxville, Tenn., with his 2 children. He graduated from Ohio University with a degree in sports administration.

References

External links 

1959 births
Living people
Sportspeople from Columbus, Ohio
Cleveland Indians coaches
Houston Astros coaches
Kansas City Royals coaches
Major League Baseball hitting coaches
Toronto Blue Jays coaches
Ohio Bobcats baseball players
Baseball catchers
New York Yankees personnel
Tennessee Volunteers baseball coaches
Chicago White Sox coaches